Şanlıurfa Archaeology and Mosaic Museums or Şanlıurfa Museum are located in the south-eastern city of Şanlıurfa (also known as Urfa), Turkey. Both museums are located at Haleplibahçe Mahallesi 2372, Sok Eyyübiye/Şanlıurfa (across the Şanlıurfa Piazza Mall).

The location history and the building
The old museum located at Çamlık Caddesi was opened in 1969 with a display area of 1500sq.m. Later on annexes were added. Before that, archaeological finds were displayed in the rooms of the Şehit-Nüsret-elementary school, therefore in Atatürk-elementary school.

The current museum is on Haleplibahçe street, close to Balıklıgöl, a sacred pool. The museum opened in 2015, and replaced the former museum of Şanlıurfa on Çamlık street. The museum consists of two major buildings. To the north is the archaeology museum and to the south is the mosaic museum. In addition to exhibition halls there are offices, a museum lab, a library, restaurants, markets and a playground for kids.

The  museum has 3 floors and covers 2,500 square meters of indoor space.

The mosaic museum

The mosaic of Orpheus was created in 184 A.D. in Edessa. It was found in 1980, and was taken to United States by illegal means. After some handovers, it returned to Şanlıurfa from the Dallas Museum in 2015.

The archaeology section

In the ground and upper floor there are four exhibition halls. The first exhibition hall is reserved for Assyrian, Babylonian and Hittite artifacts. In the second and third halls, Neolithic, Chalcolithic and Bronze Age items such as stone tools, terracota ceramic tools, stamps, pithoi, necklaces, figurines, metallic tools, ornaments, and idols are exhibited. One of the most important items is a 9500-year-old sculpture which is the oldest-known life-size human sculpture. In the ethnographic section, clothes, silver and bronze ornaments, handworks, doors with epitaph, examples of calligraphy, and hand written Korans are exhibited. In the yard, there are various archaeologic items.

It includes the Urfa Man statue, dated c. 9000 BC (11,000 years ago), being considered as the oldest life-sized sculpture of a human already discovered.

Gallery

References

External links

virtual tour
Turkish Government website

Buildings and structures in Şanlıurfa
Museums in Turkey
1987 establishments in Turkey
Tourist attractions in Şanlıurfa Province
Museums established in 1987
Archaeological museums in Turkey
Museums established in 1969
1969 establishments in Turkey